Karuppu Nila is a 1995 Tamil-language action film directed R. Aravindraj and produced by A. S. Ibrahim Rowther. The film stars Vijayakanth, Ranjitha and Khushbu, with M. N. Nambiar, Kazan Khan, R. Sundarrajan, Major Sundarrajan, S. S. Chandran, Srividya and P. C. Ramakrishna playing supporting roles. It was released on 15 January 1995, and turned out to be a hit at the box office.

Plot 

Shanmuga Pandian (Vijayakanth) is a kind-hearted person who lives with his father Selvanayagam (P. C. Ramakrishna), mother Lakshmi (Srividya), and sister Sumathi (Meena Kumari). Selvanayagam is a respected estate owner. Later, Shanmuga Pandian and Divya (Ranjitha) fall in love with each other.

At Sumathi's wedding, Selvanayagam is falsely arrested for supplying weapons to terrorists. If it turns out to be true, all his savings will be donated to the coffers of the State. Thereafter, Sumathi's wedding is stopped, Lakshmi becomes paralysed, and Divya refuses to marry him only because Shanmuga Pandian became poor.

Afterwards, Nandhini (Khushbu) hires Shanmuga Pandian in her company, but Nandhini's father considers Selvanayagam as his nemesis. Shanmuga Pandian and Nandhini fall in love with each other.

The conspiracy against Selvanayagam was in fact planned by the corrupt politician P.K.R (S. S. Chandran) and his son Vasu (Kazan Khan). Later, Divya marries Vasu, but the sadistic Vasu tortures Divya. The rest of the story concerns Shanmuga Pandian proving his father's innocence and exacting revenge on the villains with the help of Divya and Nandhini. In this process, Divya dies, and Shanmuga Pandian eventually marries Nandhini.

Cast 

Vijayakanth as Shanmuga Pandian
Ranjitha as Divya
Khushbu as Nandhini
M. N. Nambiar as Nandhini's father
R. Sundarrajan as Sundaram
S. S. Chandran as P.K.R
Srividya as Lakshmi, Shanmuga Pandian's mother
P. C. Ramakrishna as Selvanayagam, as Shanmuga Pandian's father
Meena Kumari as Sumathi, Shanmuga Pandian's sister
Kazan Khan as Vasu
Kullamani as Kulla
Major Sundarrajan
Loose Mohan
Swaminathan
Reena
Peeli Sivam
Kallapart Natarajan
Pasi Narayanan
Vellai Subbaiah
Karuppu Subbiah
Premi
Vaijayanti
Raviraj
Mannangatti Subramaniam

Soundtrack 
The music was composed by Deva, with lyrics written by Vaali and Piraisoodan.

Reception 
R. P. R. of Kalki noted that despite having able technicians, the film makes audience squirm from beginning to the end citing various reasons such as too many emotional scenes for an action film, apart from gun, car, motor boat, helicopter chasing and hastily added things like Premananda issue, court scenes and lengthy dialogues. He however said that Vijayakanth, despite having visibly aged, was able to perform his fight scenes well.

References

External links 
 

1990s Tamil-language films
1995 films
Films directed by R. Aravindraj
Films scored by Deva (composer)